Paul Olberg (born: Hirsch Schmuschkowitz, 22 November 1878 – 4 May 1960) was a Latvian-born German-Swedish journalist and a Menshevik. In 1917, after the October Revolution, went into exile in Berlin, where he lived for many years.  He worked as a correspondent for Swedish social democratic newspapers. In 1933, he fled to Stockholm; that year, he became Secretary of the Stockholm-based Socialist Rescue Committee for German Refugees.

Olberg was Scandinavian representative of the Jewish Labor Committee, and headed the JLC's Stockholm office; from 1945, he coordinated the JLC's postwar services to refugees in Scandinavia.

In 1957 Olberg was a member of the coordinating committee of the International Jewish Labor Bund.

Bibliography 

 Briefe aus Sowjet-Russland, 1919
 Die Bauernrevolution in Russland: Die alte und die neue Politik Sowjet-Russlands, 1922
 Die Tragödie des Baltikums: Die Annexion der freien Republiken Estland, Lettland und Litauen, 1941
 Det moderna Egypten i det andra världskriget, Natur & Kultur, 1943
 Antisemitism i Sovjet, Natur & Kultur, 1953

Further reading

References 

1878 births
1960 deaths
People from Jēkabpils
People from Courland Governorate
Latvian Jews
Bundists
Mensheviks
Latvian journalists
Jewish socialists
Latvian emigrants to Germany
German emigrants to Sweden